Alternate Line service is a GSM feature for supporting two different phone numbers for voice service on the same mobile device.

The Alternate Line Service (ALS) was introduced as additional service with the former "PCS-1800" (now better known as GSM1800) standard, in a specification called CPHS. This is the reason that GSM900 singleband phones do not support this feature, while the corresponding GSM1800 version often does (e.g. Ericsson GH-337 vs. PH-337). Later it became part of the GSM-Specs and was adapted even by some traditional GSM900 providers, e.g. A1(AT)and orange also in AT.

This service does not work currently with Android devices.

Support to date
 Supported by many, but not all, GSM mobile devices.
 Some, but not all, mobile devices support different ring tones for different lines.
 Supported by many, but not all, GSM service providers.

GSM standard